Benjamin Moore Estate, also known as Chelsea, is a historic estate located at Muttontown in Nassau County, New York.  It was designed in 1923–1924 by architect William Adams Delano (1874–1960) for Benjamin Moore and Alexandra Emery.  The manor house is an eclectic Chinese and French Renaissance style inspired dwelling.  It is "U" shaped, two and one half stories high with hipped and gable roofs, covered with concrete block on a concrete foundation.  The front facade features a steeply pitched roof, four large irregularly spaced chimneys, and a large brick tourelle with a conical roof. The property also has a contributing formal garden, gatehouse, picturesque roadways, garage, conservatory, octagonal gazebo, shed and tool house, and large open lawns.

It was listed on the National Register of Historic Places in 1979.

References

External links

Official Site
Muttontown Preserve; including the Chelsea Mansion (Nassau County Government)

Houses in Nassau County, New York
Houses completed in 1924
Houses on the National Register of Historic Places in New York (state)
National Register of Historic Places in Nassau County, New York
Delano & Aldrich buildings
Renaissance Revival architecture in New York (state)